"The Plague" is the sixth episode of the second series of the Channel 4 religion-themed sitcom Father Ted, and the twelfth episode overall. It is the second of three episodes featuring Jim Norton as Bishop Len Brennan.

Synopsis
The episode begins with a pre-opening prologue scene in which we see a self-referential "Father Ted" mock title sequence with "Ted" being replaced by "Ben" and the title's font also being slightly changed, which then cuts to Dougal sitting in front of the television shouting excitedly to Ted that the programme is starting. Each comments on the spoof character representing themselves, Dougal saying that Brendan is "an eejit" and Ted making fun of Ben for being "a big thicko". The original Father Ted titles follow.

The first scene, set at night, sees three people explore a forest-like setting; during the time of these events, a snap is heard from somewhere and the three people's flashlight looks for anything nearby - the light then comes upon a shocking sight resting among the trees: Jack, unconscious and with little or no clothing (it is unknown at this time if Jack has little clothing or none).

At the Parochial House, Dougal gets a pet rabbit which, after much deliberation, he calls Sampras, because of "that whole tennis-rabbit connection". Meanwhile, Jack has acquired a habit of sleepwalking naked, frightening a friend of Bishop Brennan, who demands a stop be put to this and arranges to visit the parochial house to inspect new security arrangements. Unfortunately, the Bishop has a fear of rabbits due to a bad experience he once had with some in a lift which means Ted and Dougal must get Sampras out of the way before he visits. They fail, and the situation is exacerbated as more and more rabbits gradually appear in the Parochial House, apparently from nowhere.

Ted and Dougal then resort to desperate measures to hide the constantly growing number of rabbits, such as hiding them at the local greyhound track, trying to give them to their accident-prone friend Father Larry Duff (who now has 12 Rottweilers - after the call ends, Larry makes the unwise choice of reaching his arm out to one of his pets and the consequence is that he is chomped and gnashed at the moment the Rottweilers chomp on his reaching arm and pull him down to the floor out of the audience's sight) and getting Tom, the local psychopath, to look after them (Rather than look after them in a proper sense, Tom would like to look after them in the sense of killing them, thinking about beheading them as his first choice), all to no avail. The Bishop soon arrives, and Ted shows him the security arrangements for Jack (which involve a cage and barbed wire around his bed and straitjacket pyjamas (that Ted claims are impossible to get off), as well as a tracking device and cameras). In the conversation, the Bishop notices a rabbit hutch filled with lettuce on the floor (Ted tells him that they grow lettuce indoors in a cage, but however, the audience suspects that this, in reality, is a ruse), rabbit droppings on the carpet (which Ted says is caviar - another statement of deception) and Mrs. Doyle walking in with water and lettuce (Ted takes the bowl, gulps the water and eats the lettuce), all of which prompt the Bishop to go to bed.

Ted then realises that Dougal left the rabbits in the spare bedroom, where Brennan is sleeping, but after distracting the Bishop, they discover that the rabbits are not there, suspecting they must have followed Jack into his room because of a scent they think Jack has that is attracting them. However, while Ted's back is turned, Jack circumvents the security measures and escapes, and the rabbits, as a result, follow. Ted notices a rabbit entering the spare bedroom, and he and Dougal tiptoe in to get the rabbits back out before the Bishop awakens and sees the rabbits.

Unfortunately for the Fathers, they are severely too late as the Bishop wakes up and turns on the light to find himself surrounded by rabbits, as well as a nude Jack next to him in his bed. Ted tells Brennan that it is just a "bad dream", and the Bishop lies back down to sleep (accompanied by Jack also lying back down), only to wake up again seconds later loudly screaming in horror (As the episode's before-end-credits final scene ends, the Bishop's loud, drawn-out scream echoes during both the shot of his scream and then the Parochial House itself), having realised what is happening.

Popular culture 
 
 This episode contains a subtle reference to Pulp Fiction: Tom chooses between a hammer, baseball bat, chainsaw and katana to kill the rabbits, just as Butch in Pulp Fiction chooses between these weapons to fight Zed and Maynard. Also, one of the rabbits apparently looks like Harvey Keitel.
 On the wall at the back of the room where Tom is showing the priests how he will take care of the rabbits, a section of the word "Redrum" can be seen - this is a reference to elements from the film The Shining: "Redrum" is a reverse-spelling of "murder".
 Bishop Brennan, as he talks to Ted and Dougal, explains that he has left his fire to "...deal with the cast of..." the 1980s-commenced film franchise "...Police Academy!", using the franchise's title to stylise his treating of the Fathers as his belief of them being incompetent and useless and instead acting like as if they are mockeries of proper Priests with their behaviours.

External links

 

Father Ted episodes
1996 British television episodes